Meadowsweet may refer to:

Plants
Filipendula or meadowsweets, a plant genus
Filipendula ulmaria or meadowsweet, native to Europe and western Asia
Filipendula rubra or prairie meadowsweet, native to North America
Spiraea or meadowsweets, a plant genus of the Northern Hemisphere
Spiraea alba or meadowsweet, native to eastern North America
Spiraea japonica or Japanese meadowsweet
Spiraea tomentosa or meadowsweet, native to the United States and Canada
Spiraea trilobata or Asian meadosweet
Spiraea virginiana or Virginia meadowsweet

Other uses
Meadowsweet (novel), a romance novel by Baroness Emmuska Orczy
HMS Meadowsweet (K144), a Royal Navy warship
Meadowsweet (restaurant), a restaurant in New York City